The FMW World Street Fight 6-Man Tag Team Championship was a championship in Frontier Martial-Arts Wrestling. It was initially active from May 1996 until May 1999. The title was abandoned by Shoichi Arai on November 20, 1998 and presented to the departing Atsushi Onita as a tribute to Onita for founding FMW and taking the company to a major level. The title was replaced in July 1999 with the WEW 6-Man Tag Team Championship.

On October 30, 2015, it was announced that the FMW World Street Fight 6-Man Tag Team Championship will be reactivated for the newly-resurrected FMW promotion. The new champions were determined on December 22. The title was again deactivated in October 2016.

Title history

References

Hardcore wrestling championships
Trios wrestling tag team championships
Frontier Martial-Arts Wrestling championships